Delighted is an unreleased 2016 drama film written and directed by Abdolreza Kahani. Starring Mahnaz Afshar, Tannaz Tabatabaei, Aida Mahiani, Mehran Ghafourian and Sahar Dolatshahi, Delighted is the story of three Iranian women "who want to have a good time" and to attain that end, are doing their best to find rich men for themselves.

Plot

Cast
 Mahnaz Afshar as Tina
 Tannaz Tabatabaei as Bahareh
 Aida Mahiani as Nazanin
 Mehran Ghafourian as Behrouz
 Sahar Dolatshahi as Mahsa

Issues
The film is the third of Kahani's to be refused permission to be screened in Iran, after Over There in 2008 and We've Got Time in 2014. In the hopes of recovering its production costs, Delighted was scheduled to be screened in Toronto in November 2017. Kahani cancelled the screening and refunded the ticket receipts after Iran's Ministry of Culture and Islamic Guidance threatened to ban the domestic release of his next film—the expensive Thai-Iranian production, We Like You Mrs. Yaya—if he refused to comply. "The Guidance Ministry sent a message and 'politely recommended' that the film should not be put on screen despite the fact that tickets had already been sold". All the scheduled screenings in Canada, the UK, Germany, the Czech Republic, France, and Australia were cancelled, and hopes of a Netflix deal were dashed. According to an Iranian official in late November 2017, "[Delighted] cannot be screened inside or outside the country" absent a permit to do so.

References

External links 

Unreleased films
Censorship in Iran
Iranian drama films
Film controversies in Iran